Toby Lin Wright (born November 19, 1970) is a former American football safety in the National Football League (NFL) for the Los Angeles/St. Louis Rams and Washington Redskins. He played college football at the University of Nebraska and was drafted in the second round of the 1994 NFL Draft. He attended Dobson High School in Mesa, Arizona. His brother Terry Wright also played in the NFL.

External links
 
 Just Sports Stats

1970 births
Living people
American football safeties
Los Angeles Rams players
St. Louis Rams players
Washington Redskins players
Nebraska Cornhuskers football players
Players of American football from Phoenix, Arizona
Las Vegas Outlaws (XFL) players
San Francisco Demons players